Takkar may refer to:

Media 
 Takkar (1980 film), a Bollywood action film
 Takkar (1995 film), a Bollywood romance crime film
 Takkar (2008 film), a Bengali film
 Takkar (2021 film), a Kannada-language film

Other 

 Sardar Ali Takkar, a Pakistani Pashto singer

 Takkar (Mardan District), a village and union council of Mardan District, Pakistan